Puka Mach'ay (Quechua puka red, mach'ay cave, "red cave", also spelled Pucamachay) is a mountain in the Cordillera Blanca in the Andes of Peru, about  high. It is located in the Ancash Region, Huari Province, Chavín de Huantar District. Puka Mach'ay lies east of Qishqi. One of the little lakes south of it is named Pukaqucha (Quechua for "red lake").

Sources

Mountains of Peru
Mountains of Ancash Region